Dorottya Udvaros (born 4 August 1954) is a Hungarian actress. She has appeared in more than 60 films and television shows since 1976. She won the award for Best Actress at the 15th Moscow International Film Festival for her role in Love, Mother.

Selected filmography
 Dögkeselyű (1982)
  (1983)
 Night Rehearsal (1983)
 Oh, Bloody Life (1984)
 Colonel Redl (1985)
 Love, Mother (1987)
 Miss Arizona (1987)
 Jesus Christ's Horoscope (1989)
 Meeting Venus (1991)
 Out of Order (1997)

References

External links

1954 births
Living people
Hungarian film actresses
20th-century Hungarian actresses
21st-century Hungarian actresses
Actresses from Budapest